Thomas William Barker (1861–1912) was a Carmarthenshire solicitor, and Registrar of the Diocese of St David's. His father, J. H. Barker, was also a solicitor, and they worked together as partners of the firm Barker, Morris, and Barker.

In 1897 Thomas was appointed Secretary to the Bishop of St David's, and in 1899 was appointed Registrar of the Diocese of St. David's, remaining in the position until his death in 1912.

References 

Welsh solicitors
1861 births
1912 deaths